The  was a Japanese domain located in Mino Province (present-day Kaizu, Gifu). For most of its history, it was ruled by the Takasu-Matsudaira, a branch of the Tokugawa clan of Owari Domain.

Matsudaira Katamori, Matsudaira Sadaaki, Tokugawa Yoshikatsu, and Tokugawa Mochinaga, four important figures in Bakumatsu-era Japan, were the sons of Matsudaira Yoshitatsu, one of Takasu's last daimyō.

History
In 1600, after the Battle of Sekigahara, Takagi Morikane was dispossessed of Takasu Castle for having sided with the pro-Toyotomi Western Army under Ishida Mitsunari. He was replaced by Tokunaga Nagamasa, one of Tokugawa Ieyasu’s generals and was assigned a fief with a kokudaka of 50,673 koku. The marked the start of Takasu Domain under the Tokugawa shogunate. His son, Tokunaga Masashige, increased the kokudaka to 53,000 koku; however, he was dispossessed in 1628 over his failure to complete the rebuilding of the walls of Osaka Castle, and the domain was suppressed.

Takasu Domain was revived in 1640 as a 22,000 koku holding for a cadet branch of the Ogasawara clan from Sekiyado Domain in Shimōsa. However, the domain suffered greatly from flood damage, and the shogunate transferred the Ogasawara to Katsuyama Domain in Echizen in 1691.

The domain was revived a third time in 1700, this time as a 30,000 koku holding for Matsudaira Yoshiyuki, the younger son of Tokugawa Mitsutomo of Owari Domain. Matsudaira Yoshiyuki was already daimyō of the 30,000 koku Takai Domain in Mino Province since 1681, and traded this territory of Takasu Domain, which then became a subsidiary to Owari Domain. The domain remained in the hands of his descendants until the Meiji restoration.

Although administered as a part of Owari Domain, the position of Takasu Domain was somewhat ambiguous, as it was authorized directly by the shogunate rather than by Owari Domain. On the other hand, its daimyō lived permanently in Edo, and administered domain affairs through appointed officials, rather than residing in the domain and was thus not subject to Sankin-kōtai.

Bakumatsu period holdings
As with most domains in the han system, Takasu Domain consisted of a discontinuous territories calculated to provide the assigned kokudaka, based on periodic cadastral surveys and projected agricultural yields.

Mino Province
 13 villages in Kaisai District
15 villages in Ishizu District
Shinano Province
42 villages in Ina District

List of daimyō

Simplified genealogy

 Tokugawa Ieyasu, 1st Tokugawa Shōgun (1543-1616; r. 1603–1605)
Tokugawa Yoshinao, 1st Lord of Owari (1601-1650)
 Tokugawa Mitsutomo, 2nd Lord of Owari (1625-1700)
Tokugawa Tsunanari, 3rd Lord of Owari (1652-1699)
  II. Matsudaira Yoshitaka, 2nd Lord of Takasu (1694-1732; r. 1715–1732)
 I. Matsudaira Yoshiyuki, 1st Lord of Takasu (1656-1715; Lord of Takasu: cr. 1700)
Matsudaira Tomoaki, Head of the Kawado-Kubo line (1678-1728)
 III. Matsudaira Yoshiaki, 3rd Lord of Takasu (later Tokugawa Munekatsu, 8th Lord of Owari) (1705-1761; 3rd Lord of Takasu: 1732–1739; 8th Lord of Owari: 1739–1761)
 IV. Matsudaira Yoshitoshi, 4th Lord of Takasu (1734-1771; r. 1739–1771)
 V. Matsudaira Yoshitomo, 5th Lord of Takasu (1760-1793; r. 1771–1777)
 VI. Matsudaira Yoshihiro, 6th Lord of Takasu (1762-1795; r. 1777–1795)
 VII. Matsudaira Katsumasa, 7th Lord of Takasu (1738-1801; r. 1795–1801)
Tokugawa Yorinobu, 1st Lord of Kishū (1602-1671)
Tokugawa Mitsusada, 2nd Lord of Kishū (1627-1705)
 Tokugawa Yoshimune, 8th Tokugawa Shōgun (1684-1751; 5th Lord of Kishū: 1705–1716; 8th Tokugawa Shōgun: 1716–1745)
 Tokugawa Munetada, 1st Hitotsubashi-Tokugawa family head (1721-1765)
Tokugawa Harusada, 2nd Hitotsubashi-Tokugawa family head (1751-1827)
 VIII. Matsudaira Yoshisue, 8th Lord of Takasu (1785-1804; r. 1801–1804)
 Tokugawa Yorifusa, 1st Lord of Mito (1603-1661)
 Matsudaira Yorishige, 1st Lord of Takamatsu (1622-1695)
 Matsudaira Yoriyuki (1661-1687)
 Matsudaira Yoritoyo, 3rd Lord of Takamatsu (1680-1735)
 Tokugawa Munetaka, 4th Lord of Mito (1705-1730)
Tokugawa Munemoto, 5th Lord of Mito (1728-1766)
Tokugawa Harumori, 6th Lord of Mito (1751-1805)
  IX. Matsudaira Yoshinari, 9th Lord of Takasu (1776-1832; r. 1804–1832)
  X. Matsudaira Yoshitatsu, 10th Lord of Takasu (1800-1862; r. 1832–1850)
 XI. Matsudaira Yoshichika, 11th Lord of Takasu (later Tokugawa Mochinaga, 10th Hitotsubashi-Tokugawa family head) (1831-1884; r. 1850–1858)
  XII. Matsudaira Yoshimasa, 12th Lord of Takasu (1858-1860; r. 1858–1860)
  XIII. Matsudaira Yoshitake, 13th Lord of Takasu (1859-1891; r. 1860–1869)

References

Kobiyama, Rokurō (2005). Shashinshū: Matsudaira Katamori no shōgai. Tokyo: Shin Jinbutsu Ōraisha.
 "Takasu-han" on Edo 300 HTML (29 Feb. 2008)

1870 disestablishments in Japan
Domains of Japan
History of Gifu Prefecture
Mino Province
Ogasawara clan
Owarirenshi-Matsudaira clan